Rhynchotropis is a genus of flowering plants in the legume family, Fabaceae. It belongs to the tribe Indigofereae of the subfamily Faboideae.

Species
Rhynchotropis comprises the following species:
 Rhynchotropis marginata (N.E.Br.) J.B.Gillett
 Rhynchotropis poggei (Taub.) Harms

Species names with uncertain taxonomic status
The status of the following species is unresolved:
 Rhynchotropis curtisiae I.M.Johnst.
 Rhynchotropis dekindtii Harms

References

External links

Indigofereae
Fabaceae genera